Anthony Vincent Valbiro, also known by the online alias Ten Second Songs, is an American YouTuber and musician based in Port Chester, New York. He gained recognition for singing covers of popular songs in different styles and genres.

Career
Vincent played bass in the band Rot in Pain, who released their debut EP in 2003. He began to sing in 2005 and formed the band Set the Charge with his brother Frank in 2007. He refined his vocal skills while studying under Ken Tamplin.

Vincent started an Internet radio channel with his brother, which later evolved into a music production business. He began to make videos on Fiverr and created his YouTube channel to promote his business. He gained a large following in 2014 after releasing a cover of "Dark Horse" in 20 different styles. In 2014, Set the Charge began playing shows as a four-piece band. 

Vincent has collaborated with other artists such as Jared Dines and Eric Calderone. In 2018, Vincent and Calderone formed the band Riptide. In 2019, Vincent portrayed John Corabi in the Mötley Crüe biopic The Dirt.

Before 2021, Vincent primarily went by his online alias Ten Second Songs. He rebranded his YouTube channel as Anthony Vincent in March of that year.

Discography
Solo albums
Songs in 20 Styles or More (2017, as Ten Second Songs)
Ten Second Songs, Vol. 1 (2020, as Ten Second Songs)
Ten Second Songs, Vol. 2 (2020, as Ten Second Songs)

Rot in Pain
Rot in Pain (2003 - EP)

Set the Charge
Auditory Insemination (2015 - EP)
Sky Goes On (2017)

References

1987 births
American YouTubers
People from Port Chester, New York
Musicians from New York (state)
Date of birth missing (living people)
Living people
Music YouTubers